The Mayor of the Mymensingh City is the chief executive of the Mymensingh City Corporation. The Mayor's office administers all city services, public property, most public agencies, and enforces all city and state laws within Mymensingh city.

The Mayor's office is located in Nagar Bhaban; it has jurisdiction over all 33 wards of Mymensingh City

List of officeholders

References